Kenneth Alan Howery (born November 4, 1975) is an American entrepreneur and diplomat. He is a co-founder of PayPal and Founders Fund. He served as the U.S. Ambassador to Sweden from 2019 to 2021 under President Donald Trump.

Early life and education
Howery was born in 1975 in Texas. Later graduating from Stanford University in 1998 with a B.A. in economics. While at Stanford, he was managing editor of The Stanford Review, a student-run newspaper founded by Peter Thiel.

Career 
The same year he graduated, he co-founded PayPal with Peter Thiel, Luke Nosek, Elon Musk, and Max Levchin. The group of founders became known as the PayPal Mafia, which included other peers and early investors. From 1998 to 2002, Howery served as PayPal's CFO. Following PayPal's acquisition by eBay in 2002, Howery served as eBay's Director of Corporate Development until 2003. Howery then rejoined  Thiel in 2004 at Clarium Capital Management, where he served as vice president of private equity, as well as a member of the research and trading teams.

In March 2012, the World Economic Forum named Howery a Young Global Leader, a community of “socially-minded men and women selected under the age of 40, who operate as a force for good to overcome barriers that elsewhere stand in the way of progress." He is also a member of the Selection Committee for the World Economic Forum Technology Pioneers Program.

In 2005, Howery and Thiel, along with fellow PayPal alumnus, Luke Nosek, started Founders Fund, a San Francisco-based venture capital firm with over $3 billion under management, where he served as co-founder and partner. He has served on the boards of Quantcast and ZocDoc. In 2010, Venture Capital Journal named Howery one of the Top 10 VCs under 36. He has lectured on entrepreneurship at Harvard Business School and Stanford, and has helped students at UC Berkeley and the McCombs School of Business develop business models.

Howery is a member of The Explorers Club, a non-profit group that promotes scientific exploration.

Howery serves as an advisor to Kiva, a 501(c)(3) charity organization which enables people to lend money via the Internet to low-income entrepreneurs and students in over 80 countries. He is a member of the U.S. Council on Competitiveness, which has a stated goal of increasing the United States' economic competitiveness in the global marketplace.

Howery's net worth stands at $1.5 billion.

Diplomacy 

On January 16, 2019, Howery was nominated by President Donald Trump to be Ambassador Extraordinary and Plenipotentiary of the United States of America to the Kingdom of Sweden. Following a confirmation hearing on May 16, 2019, the Senate Foreign Relations Committee favorably reported Howery's nomination to the Senate, which confirmed Howery on September 17, 2019, by a vote of 62–32. In his confirmation hearing, Howery stated his priorities as Ambassador would include pursuing expanded economic and trade relationships, advancing mutual security commitments, and promoting science, technology and entrepreneurship opportunities.

Howery was sworn in as Ambassador on October 10, 2019, and presented his credentials to His Majesty King Carl XVI Gustaf on November 7, 2019. 

As Ambassador, Howery was active across a number of policy areas. Howery engaged with Swedish officials on defense issues and military strategy, including pressing for increased interoperability of U.S. and Swedish military systems. He also advocated for the longstanding U.S. goal of increased European defense spending; Sweden approved a 40% increase in defense spending over five years during Howery's tenure - the largest increase in more than 70 years.

Ambassador Howery strongly advocated for clean 5G technology, promoting the official U.S Department of State position that encourages the use of equipment made by Swedish manufacturer Ericsson and asserts that Huawei-made products are a security risk to democracies. Howery met with senior Swedish officials on 5G security in September, 2020, and Sweden subsequently announced a ban on equipment from telecommunication companies Huawei and ZTE in its 5G network.

Ambassador Howery also promoted increased cooperation, including on security issues, between the U.S. and Sweden in the Arctic. In October 2020, Sweden published its first new Arctic Strategy in a decade, highlighting concerns about deteriorating global relations and the growth of military activity in the Arctic. His Arctic advocacy included helping establish a partnership between the Arctic Initiative at the Harvard Kennedy School of Government and Sweden's Luleå University of Technology. 

As Sweden serves as the protecting power for the United States in North Korea, Howery worked to maintain a strong communication channel for the push for denuclearization, and worked with Swedish officials to counter disinformation, and promote democracy, human rights, free trade, and regional security.

Ambassador Howery advocated for the importance of transparency and information-sharing between countries to respond effectively to the COVID-19 pandemic. He led efforts by U.S. Embassy Stockholm to assist Swedish manufacturer Getinge with supply chain issues, helping it to expand production of ventilators for the benefit of COVID-19 patients in the United States and around the world.  

Ambassador Howery has engaged with the Swedish academic community, including on the role universities can play in entrepreneurship and the importance of academic integrity. He has conducted outreach to the U.S. and Swedish business communities in Sweden, including delivering speeches at the Swedish-American Chamber of Commerce and the American Chamber of Commerce. He has also engaged with top Swedish scientific research institutes, science parks, and Sweden's Innovation Agency.

References

1975 births
Living people
Ambassadors of the United States to Sweden
American chief financial officers
American financial businesspeople
American technology company founders
Businesspeople from California
PayPal people
Stanford University alumni
Place of birth missing (living people)
21st-century American diplomats